Ta Sung Lee is a Taiwanese professor of electrical engineering at National Chiao Tung University (NCTU). He studied electrical engineering at National Taiwan University as an undergraduate, graduating in 1983 before moving to the United States where he received an M.S. degree from in the same field from the University of Wisconsin–Madison in 1987 and a Ph.D. from Purdue University in 1989. The following year, he returned to Taiwan, where he joined the NCTU faculty. He was named Fellow of the Institute of Electrical and Electronics Engineers (IEEE) in 2016  "for leadership and contributions in communication systems and signal processing".

References 

Year of birth missing (living people)
Living people
Fellow Members of the IEEE
Academic staff of the National Chiao Tung University
National Taiwan University alumni
Purdue University College of Health and Human Sciences alumni
University of Wisconsin–Madison College of Engineering alumni